André Gérardin (1879–1953), French mathematician
  (1849-1930), French painter
  (1843-1921), member of the Paris Commune
 , French football referee, active in the 1920s
  (1889-1936), French diplomat, ambassador to Poland
  (1827-?), member of the Paris Commune
 Louis Gérardin a.k.a. Toto (1912–1982), French track cyclist
 , French industrialist, founder of the Compagnie française des métaux
  (1907-1935), French painter
 Sandra Dijon-Gérardin (born 1976), French basketball player 
 Sébastien Gérardin (1751–1816), French naturalist

See also 
 Girardin (disambiguation)
 Gérard
 Gerard
 Gherardini, Gherardini family

French-language surnames